A citizens' assembly (also known as citizens' jury or citizens' panel or people's jury or policy jury or citizens' initiative review or consensus conference or citizens' convention) is a randomly-selected group of people who deliberate on important public questions.

It draws on the symbolism, and some of the practices, of a trial by jury. The purpose is to recruit a cross-section of the public to study the selected issues. Groups whose recommendations aren't binding are more similar to deliberative opinion polls as they need a referendum or other process of policy approval.

Assemblies aim to increase public trust by remedying the "divergence of interests" that arises between elected representatives and the electorate, as well as "a lack in deliberation in legislatures."

While earliest confirmed example took place in Athenian democracy, they have become newly relevant both to theorists and politicians as part of a growing interest in deliberative democracy and popular sovereignty. Assemblies have been used in countries such as Canada and the Netherlands to deliberate for example, on electoral reforms. Assemblies have also been used or proposed for dealing with divisive issues such as same-sex marriage, abortion, and decarbonisation.

Independent assemblies, such as the Le G1000 in Belgium or the We The Citizens project in Ireland may also convene, though state-sponsored efforts are most common. The People's Parliament was a UK forum of randomly selected citizens presented as a television program. Citizen's Assemblies have now been convened on a global level.

Defining features

Membership 
Selecting and managing members is integral to fulfilling the assembly's goal. Some of the components are described below.

Selection
Quasi-random selection or sortition is often used to ensure that a representative spectrum of the population is included. Elections by contrast overrepresent variously advantaged citizens. Random selection is recommended on the grounds of equality, cost efficiency, and representativeness. Selection is only quasi-random, due to the additional variables of self-selection and deliberate over-representation of specific groups. When people are not required to participate, those who opt out may share characteristics that render the resulting group less than representative. To prevent this, quotas can be established to restore the balance. Quota systems can be implemented in different ways; a straightforward "naive" implementation of quotas can result in a system that mistakenly "over-reacts" to individuals at the intersection of multiple overrepresented sets and over-excludes them from selection. Regardless of the desired recruitment algorithm, recruitment can sometimes be sabotaged by faulty implementation. Random selection in governance has historic significance and the earliest known instances include the Athenian democracy and various European communities.

Term limits 
Regular turnover of representatives is often a requisite: Participants serve for a limited time. This standard is can help to maintain viewpoint diversity in the long term and avoid sorting the assembly into in-groups and out-groups that bias the result. Absent term limits, the assembly may become homogenous or turn to private interest, losing sight of the common good.

Size
The size of a citizens' assembly must be large enough to capture a representative cross-section of the population. The size depends on the purpose, demographics, and population size of the community. Assemblies are typically relatively small for ease of management and to ensure active participation among all members. Assemblies typically consist of between 50 and 200 citizens. In Ireland, the 2012-14 Convention on the Constitution was composed of 66 citizens, 33 representatives chosen by political parties, and a chairperson; Ireland's subsequent recurring Assembly recruited 99 citizens reflecting the country's demographic diversity, and appointed an expert chairperson. The 2019-20 Citizens' Assembly of Scotland consists of 100 citizens. The 2020 Citizens' Climate Assembly UK consists of 110 members.

Functions

The function of a citizen's assembly has no a priori limits. Though assemblies have been historically limited to proposals concerning electoral reform, the purpose of an assembly can vary widely.

Proposal power versus decision-making power 
Modern assemblies typically propose rather than enact. Assembly proposals in those systems are then enacted (or not) by the corresponding authority. Sometimes a proposal is sent to the general electorate as a referendum.

Procedure

Deliberation 
A key component of assemblies is their deliberative nature. Deliberation allows for the education of participants, who may be uninformed on the specific issue of interest. Assemblies typically provide access to experts, including politicians, analysts, scientists and other subject-matter experts. By incorporating the views, information and arguments of experts and then asking the participants to engage in collaborative discussion, assemblies aim to educate the participants, and produce a vote or result representative of the educated public interest. Deliberation allows for representation of the common person while attempting to mitigate misinformation, ignorance, and apathy. Initiatives such as deliberative polling attempt to utilize this benefit.

Parkinson argues that the intent of deliberation is to "replace power plays and political tantrums with 'the mild voice of reason'". Deliberation attempts to marry procedural effectiveness with substantive outcomes. Parkinson continues that the process reframes "political legitimacy" as involving "not just doing things right, but doing the right things". This view contrasts with the purely procedural account of legitimacy, of which Rawls says "there is a correct or fair procedure such that the outcome is likewise correct or fair, whatever it is, provided the procedure has been followed properly." While deliberation is itself a procedure, it deliberately incorporates factual information, and thus broadens the consideration of legitimacy.

Agenda-setting 
Agenda-setting refers to establishing a plan for the substantive issues that the assembly is to consider. In major examples of assemblies, such as those in British Columbia and Ontario, the legislature set the agenda before the assemblies were convened. However, Dahl asserts that final control over agendas is an essential component of an ideal democracy: "the body of citizens...should have the exclusive control to determine what matters are or are not to be decided." This problem remains unresolved, as both agendas imposed from outside or from a small internal body limit the participants' scope. While the petition process theoretically extends the agenda-setting process to all citizens, petition gathering mechanics may be burdensome. Fishkin writes "The equal opportunity is formal and symbolic, while effective final control is exercised by those who can finance the signature gatherers."

Guardrails 
Especially when juries or assemblies have more than advisory powers, the checks and balances grow to ensure that those participating can't make unilateral decisions or concentrate power. In Ancient Athens, for example, this meant a complex array of carrots and sticks as guardrails that successfully blunted the temptation of corruption. Étienne Chouard argues that in large part because elected politicians wrote the constitutions, that governments that use elections have far fewer guardrails in place than those based largely on sortition.

Decision 
At some point, the assembly must conclude its deliberations and offer conclusions and recommendations. This is typically done in a voting process. The use of secret ballots is intended to reduce the impact of peer pressure and to control social comparison.

Examples of Deliberative Polling 

Assemblies have been most often used as a form of deliberative polling, where the recommendations aren't binding, leading to lower turnout and different process design than in binding assemblies or juries.

Global Assembly

The Global Assembly was organised in 2021 to coincide with the COP26 in Glasgow in October–November 2021.  It is the first body that can make any claim to represent the democratic wishes of the global population as a whole.

Belgium

The G1000 is a donation-funded initiative launched in 2011 by David Van Reybrouck with an online survey to identify issues. More than 5,000 suggestions were put forward and ranked by thousands of citizens. After clustering, 25 themes were put forward for a second round of voting. Next, 700 of the 1000 participants come together for a day to deliberate in Brussels. They were split into groups of 10 and after a briefing by experts, the participants drew on proposals around the surviving themes. A smaller group of citizens, the G32, gathered regularly over the ensuing months to refine these proposals and transform them into concrete recommendations. These recommendations were to be put to the rest of the country in April 2012.

Canada 

In Canada a policy jury or citizen jury is a body of people convened to render a decision or advice on a matter of public policy. Citizens participating in a policy jury engage in a comprehensive learning and deliberation process before finalizing a conclusion or set of recommendations.

Citizens’ Assemblies on Electoral Reform convened in British Columbia in 2004 and Ontario in 2006. They used policy juries to consider alternative electoral systems. Three of Ontario's Local Health Integration Networks (LHIN) referred their Integrated Health Service Plans (IHSP) for 2010–2013 to policy juries for advice and refinement. LHINs referring their IHSPs to policy juries include the South East LHIN, Central LHIN and Mississauga Halton LHIN.

British Columbia 

160 people and one chair participated in the British Columbia assembly to discuss and issue guidance on electoral reform.

The selection process was quasi-random. One man and one woman were randomly selected from each of British Columbia's 79 electoral districts in addition to two aboriginal members and the chair. These members were selected by a civic lottery that ensured gender balance and fair representation by age group and geography. First, 15,800 invitations were randomly mailed to British Columbians including 200 in each constituency, asking if they were willing to put their names into a draw for future candidacy. The names then went through two more selection rounds.

The resulting assembly was not very representative of the larger public. The members were dissatisfied with BC's current electoral system, while surveys of the public indicated it to be relatively satisfied.

Lang noted two similarities across the assembly: an interest in learning, especially about the political process, and a commitment to process once it started. She wrote, "this is likely to have contributed to the excellent working dynamic within the Assembly".

Emphasizing the importance of representativeness in the selection process, Pal wrote, "the requirement of an equal number of members from each electoral district resulted in Citizens' Assemblies that did not reflect the actual population and may have skewed the outcome toward proposals that prioritized geographic representation." Therefore, the emphasis on geography limited the representativeness of the final assemblies.

Process: From January to May, 2004, the assembly conducted a twelve-week "learning phase" involving expert presentations, group discussions and access to source materials. Work included a review of electoral systems in use around the world and their various effects on the political process. This was followed by a public consultation phase lasting from May to June. Assembly members held over 50 public hearings and received 1,603 written submissions. The members deliberated over which electoral system to recommend, and then the assembly took three separate votes.

Outcome: On December 10, the assembly's final report, titled "Making Every Vote Count: The Case for Electoral Reform in British Columbia" was presented to the British Columbia legislature by the assembly. In May 2005, the recommendations from the assembly were accepted by 57.7% of voters in a referendum and were supported by a majority in 77 of the 79 electoral districts. However, the referendum required 60% approval by 60% and majorities in 60% of the 79 districts in order to pass. Consequently, no change ensued. The recommendations were rejected by 60.9% of voters in a follow-up referendum.

Ontario 

A total of 103 people took part in Ontario's assembly on electoral reform. The recommendations of the Ontario assembly were rejected in the ensuing referendum by 63% of voters, retaining the status quo.

Denmark

Consensus conferences originated in Denmark in the 1980s as one of the earliest attempts by policymakers to include the lay public's opinions in their decision-making through public engagement. The purpose of consensus conferences is to “qualify people’s attitudes, inasmuch as they are given all the information they require until they are ready to assess a given technology" and the resulting product likely looks different from that of other types of assemblies due to the need to reach consensus. Consensus conferences are generally deemed suitable for topics that are socially relevant and/or that require public support.

Participants are randomly selected from a group of citizens who are invited to apply. Invitees are members of the lay public who have no specific knowledge of the issue. The resulting panel attempts to be demographically representative.

Panel members participate in two preparatory weekends and are given material prepared by a communicator to gain a basic understanding of the topic. The panel then participates in a 4-day conference. The panel participates in a Q&A session with experts, where they hear opposing views. Members then prepare a final document summarizing their views and recommendations. On the final day, the panel then discusses their final document with policy- and decision-makers.

While the consensus model was most heavily used in Denmark, it has been tried in many other parts of the world.

France

Germany 
At least 77 experiments with citizens' juries inside Germany have been conducted from 1976 (as of 2021).

Ireland

After the Irish financial crisis beginning in 2008, an assembly was among various proposals for political reform. In the 2011 general election, party manifestos included assemblies or conventions, for electoral reform (Fine Gael) or constitutional reform (Fianna Fáil, Labour Party, Sinn Féin, and the Green Party). The ensuing Fine Gael–Labour government's programme included a "Constitutional Convention" comprising a chairperson nominated by the Taoiseach, 33 legislators nominated by political parties, and 67 citizens selected to be demographically representative. It met from 2012 to 2014, discussing six issues specified by the government and then two assembly-selected issues. It issued nine reports, recommending constitutional amendments and other changes to statute law and legislative practice. The government's response was criticised as lukewarm: it implemented a few recommendations, rejected others, and referred more to committees and the civil service for review.

The Fine Gael–independent minority government formed after the 2016 general election established an assembly in July 2016 "without participation by politicians, and with a mandate to look at a limited number of key issues over an extended time period."

Netherlands 
Held in 2006 and composed of 143 randomly-selected Dutch citizens, the Burgerforum Kiesstelsel was tasked with examining options for electoral reform. On December 14, 2006, the Burgerforum presented its final report to a minister of the outgoing People's Party (VVD). A response to the report was delivered in April 2008, when it was rejected by the government of the then ruling coalition. In 2020, consultation was started on a bill to implement the group's electoral reforms.

Poland
Beginning in July 2016 after the municipal response to flooding was deemed inadequate by many citizens, Gdańsk assemblies comprising approximately 60 randomly-selected residents made binding decisions to address problems. Assembly meetings are calm and even described as enjoyable. Names from the city's voter rolls are selected randomly. The membership is then balanced according to factors such as education-level, age, sex and district. For example, the assembly has the same percentage of senior citizens as the city. The assembly meets for several days, hears testimony from experts, asks questions and deliberates in small groups before rendering its binding policy decision.

United Kingdom

Since a 1994 publication by the Institute for Public Policy Research, citizens' assemblies have become more common in the UK.

In 2019 the British government announced the UK Climate Assembly, with 108 citizens aiming to deliberate over how to reach net-zero emissions by 2050. Meetings were delayed due to the COVID-19 pandemic and took place over six weekends between January and May 2020, with a report published in September 2020.

In 2019 the government of Scotland announced the Citizens' Assembly of Scotland with 6 meetings consisting of 100 citizens taking place between October 2019 and April 2020 to address 3 questions:

 What kind of country are we seeking to build?
 How best can we overcome the challenges Scotland and the world face in the 21st century, including those arising from Brexit? 
 What further work should be carried out to give us the information we need to make informed choices about the future of the country?

The global environmental movement Extinction Rebellion has called for assemblies on climate change to be used by governments to make decisions on climate and environmental justice. In the UK, Extinction Rebellion demands that "government must create and be led by the decisions of a assembly on climate and ecological justice." The central aim of the Burning Pink political party is to replace the British government with assemblies.

In a 2019 survey conducted of British citizens by the Royal Society for the Encouragement of Arts, Manufactures, and Commerce, 57% of those surveyed thought that a citizens assembly would not be sufficiently democratic because it was not large enough. Where support was highest for a citizens assembly on Brexit in this survey was Northern Ireland. According to the RSA, this is perhaps due to greater awareness of the process thanks to the use of assemblies in the Republic of Ireland.

United States

California 
California Speaks consisted of 3,500 people representing all segments of the population.

Oregon

A Citizens’ Initiative Review (CIR) is Oregon's version of an assembly. A panel deliberates on a ballot initiative or referendum to be decided in an upcoming election. The panelists are chosen through means such as random sampling and stratified sampling to be demographically representative. The number of participants is around two dozen. They are often paid for their time and travel to that broaden the range of citizens who can participate. To date, only the state of Oregon has enacted a permanent CIR. Colorado, Arizona, and Massachusetts have conducted pilot tests of the CIR.

Process: A trained moderator oversees the discussions. Over the course of a few days, panelists deliberate among themselves and question experts and advocates on all sides of the initiative. The panelists write a statement in a form that can be made available though means such as including it in the voter's pamphlet. This statement summarizes the best arguments pro and con, and lists the number of panelists who recommended voting both for and against the initiative.

Purpose: A CIR tries to strengthen the quality and impact of the public voice in elections and government decisions. It addresses specific concerns about initiative campaigns where voters often receive little information, or else what they hear—for example, from paid advertisements—is biased. Under a CIR, voters learn what a representative body of citizens thought about the initiative after careful study and deliberation.

Evaluation: Academic research reported that CIR panelists achieved high-quality deliberation. Voters became aware of those deliberations through voters’ pamphlets and found the statement to be helpful to their decisions, and voter knowledge about the initiatives increased. The panelists themselves developed new attitudes about the political process and their own capabilities.

Washington (State)

The Washington Climate Assembly was the first state-wide climate assembly in America. The Assembly took place in 2021, gathering 77 randomly selected citizens to discuss climate change. The assembly was entirely virtual, and addressed the question: "How can Washington State equitably design and implement climate mitigation strategies while strengthening communities disproportionately impacted by climate change across the State?”  Their recommendations were brought for consideration to the State Legislature.

The organizers sought citizen input at all levels. In November 2020, they held a scoping meeting to determine what the Assembly's focus should be, and various concerns were consolidated into three possible questions. The organizers then brought these questions to "elected officials, policy experts, tribal leaders and staff, environmental non-profits, businesses, community-based organizations, climate experts, deliberative democracy experts, and leaders of color," and their feedback created the final question. The scoping process involved self-selected participants.

For the assembly, citizens were selected through stratified random sampling: 6,333 potential participants were initially contacted via phone. Researchers created 10,000 possible groups of citizens, each of which accounted for participants' gender, age, congressional district, class, race, education and beliefs on climate change. They then randomly picked one possible group. Organizers "attempted to break down barriers" to participation by providing technology (i.e. laptops and microphones) as well as childcare. Each participant was also paid $500.

In the first two months of 2021, Assembly members attended seven public "Learning Sessions" engaging both experts and affected parties. The first and last sessions were general overviews, while other sessions went into greater detail around one topic, such as the economic costs relating to climate change's effects and potential solutions. Five deliberative sessions allowed participants to determine “priority principles” and craft recommendations. The public was then allowed to comment on the Assembly's recommendations. After public comment, the Assembly members voted on their recommendations through private votes.

The Assembly organizers emphasized their commitment to equity, stating that the Assembly had a “dual focus on climate change and equity.” The facilitator teams were designed to be diverse. They were rated as neutral by most participants – at the start of the Assembly, 80% of the assembly members said the facilitators were neutral, and this reached 90% over the course of the deliberations.

The Assembly submitted its recommendations to the state legislature, which had no obligation beyond consideration. However, Democrat state representatives Fey, Fitzgibbon, Hudgins, Kirby, and Ryu expressed their support for the assembly in a Herald Net op-ed, pointing to the examples of climate assemblies in the UK and France. They wrote that the assembly was an opportunity to "help us all to bring more voices to the table to understand deeply held concerns, concerns about the status quo as well as concerns about the policies proposed to fight climate change." Support came from Republican representatives as well.

Opportunities 
Assembly proponents claim that they accomplish two of the three general requirements for direct democracy (mass representation, deliberation, and equity). It permits open and public deliberation, albeit among a small yet representative body of citizens; and it permits ratification/endorsement by the whole electorate. Democratic values and superior results are potential advantages of such institutions.

Common interest 
Electoral reform, redistricting, campaign finance law, and the regulation of political speech are often claimed to be unsuitable for  management by self-interested politicians. Assemblies have repeatedly been deployed to replace such political judgments. Fearon and separately Nino support the idea that deliberative democratic models tend to generate conditions of impartiality, rationality and knowledge, increasing the likelihood that the decisions reached are morally correct.

Several experts assert that selection by sortition prevents disproportionate influence by "special interests". Term limits further reduce the opportunities for special interests to influence assemblies.

Deliberation 
Deliberative democracy aims to harness the benefits of deliberation to produce better understanding and resolution of important issues. Assemblies are intended to stimulate deliberation, in which the participants can less easily be captured by special interest. Deliberative polling advocate Fishkin claimed that deliberation promotes better problem-solving by educating and actively engaging participants. Deliberation is claimed to lessen faction by emphasizing resolution over partisanship. Additionally, citizens who were not selected tend to perceive those chosen as both technical experts and as "ordinary" citizens like themselves. As happened in British Columbia, these features encouraged voter comfort with the actions of the assembly.

Representative and inclusive 
Random lotteries have been explored as election alternatives on grounds that it allows for more accurate representation and inclusivity. A truly randomly selected group can embody the "median voter". Participants are supposed to represent the common person. Selection by lot corrects the elitist aspect of elections. Successful political candidates typically require access to education, money and connections. Though elected legislators generally have more experience, they are likely to focus on their supporters rather than the larger population. Representative democracies have been criticized as not representative at all. The lack of female and minority representation in the US Congress is often cited as an example. While others lament the importance of branding in electing candidates (with recognizable last names, for example, fueling political dynasties).

Money is argued to have an outsized role in election outcomes. Lessig argued that elections are dominated by money. When random selection is used alongside statistical analysis, accurate representation can be attained. Overlaying quotas on the initial random selection corrects for disproportionate ability/willingness across various groups, improving representativeness.

Cognitive diversity 
Assemblies allow for increased cognitive diversity, understood as a diversity of problem-solving methods or ways of interpreting the world. Quasi-random selection does not filter out cognitive diversity as elections are alleged to do. Similarly, the process does not attempt to select the best-performing or most skilled agents.

Some studies report that cognitively diverse groups produce better results than homogenous groups. Lu and Page claim that cognitive diversity is valuable for effective problem solving. They selected two problem-solving teams from a diverse population of intelligent agents: the randomly selected team outperformed the "best-performing" agents. Unique perspectives and interpretations generally enhance analysis. These results imply that it may be more important to maximize cognitive diversity over individual competence. Landemore argued that random selection results in increased efficacy, diversity and inclusivity. In fact, Mill famously argued that governing assemblies should be a "fair sample of every grade of intellect among the people" over "a selection of the greatest political minds."

Time and cost savings 
Instead of asking all citizens to deliberate deeply on every issue at more frequent (and potentially more costly) elections, assemblies/juries can be much more representative than voting while greatly reducing overall costs to the government and its citizens.
The greatest potential for cost-savings, however, come from the quicker resolution of tough issues and the reduction in wasted spending by rooting out corruption and other inefficiencies associated with voting.

Concerns Expressed

Legitimacy

Representativeness 
Assemblies require participants to gather at a single place (or virtually) to discuss the targeted issue(s). Inevitably, not every selected individual has the time and interest to join those events. Those who attend are significantly different from those who do not.

In real-world settings, attendance varies widely depending on the cost/benefit of attending. In the case of Fishkin's "Europe in one room project", data supports the concern: only 300 out of 869 respondents participated in deliberative meetings. Those who attended and those who did not differed significantly. Some groups are significantly more likely to attend public meetings than others. In general, those who participate tend to be motivated and opinionated. This is problematic because participant group dynamics and personalities can play an important role in producing different outcomes of discussions.

Also, processes that require consensus might result in policy outcomes that don't accomplish as much as would be desired by most people.

Participation

Compared to elections, assemblies lack mass representation, as the assembly involves a tiny minority of the public. When people vote, they interact with the government and with the law. Elections and voting are an important element of sovereignty, even if the vote makes little difference. Eliminating elections undermines the consultation process that allows everyone to feel like an involved citizen in a representative democracy.

Lafont, for example, argues that assemblies undermine deliberation. She argues that this is because assemblies asking the public to accept the results of their deliberation is akin to an elite democracy. While she clarifies that "this variety differs from the standard elite model to the extent that it does not ask citizens to blindly defer to the deliberations of a consolidated political elite.... [it] blindly defer to the deliberations of a few selected citizens." Fishkin argues in turn that this model is not elite because it uses ordinary citizens who are representative of the population. Lafont rejects this characterization, arguing that people are "subjected to a filter of deliberative experience" which makes them "no longer a representative sample of the citizenry at large."

Landemore responds to Lafont by arguing that while her concerns are valid, large-scale discourse is simply impossible, never mind superior. Landemore recommends making assemblies "as 'open' to the larger public as possible." For example, their decisions could be validated via a referendum.

Fishkin notes a trilemma among the ideas of political equality, deliberation, and participation. In a body such as an assembly, political equality is achieved through a random and ideally representative selection process, while deliberation is achieved in the actions of the assembly. However, since the body is made up of a subset of the population, it does not achieve the goal of participation on a broad scale.

Fishkin attempts to solve the trilemma so posed by considering an entire deliberative society, which would constitute a deliberative macrocosm. He sees assemblies as experiments on how to realize macro-scale deliberation later on.

Threatening to incumbent power structures 
Warren and Gastil claim, in the British Columbia case, that other citizens should have been able to "treat it as a facilitative trustee (a trusted information and decision proxy)." Participants essentially became informal experts, allowing them to act as an extension of the larger public. 

The introduction of the assembly, according to John Parkinson, undermined the trust and power that British Columbia political parties and advocacy groups had gained. It could also "undermine the epistemic, ethical, and democratic functions of the whole".

Briefing materials/expert objectivity 
Briefing materials must be balanced, diverse and accurate. This presents the same problem that assemblies address: how to ensure balanced representation. One approach is to convene an advisory committee, which in turn faces the same issue.

Accountability 
Assemblies (depending on their design) might not provide enough accountability to prevent members from engaging in inappropriate behavior.

Outspoken citizens 
Conversational dynamics are important to successful assemblies. The reliance on conversation and the ultimate need to reach a conclusion, can mask differences in opinion, particularly among the less outspoken. For example, more outspoken citizens may dominate the conversation absent an effective facilitator.

Group polarization 
The possibility of group polarization is another concern. Cass Sunstein argued in 1999 that "deliberation tends to move groups, and the individuals who compose them, toward a more extreme point in the direction indicated by their own predeliberation judgments." Consensus conferences also have the potential to make individuals tend to the extreme in their opinions, i.e. citizens essentially rally around their own views in the presence of opposing views.

However, Fishkin responded that this depends on how the assembly is structured. Resources such as briefing materials and expert testimony are meant to ameliorate extreme views by supplying information and correcting misinformation/misunderstanding.

Competence of average person (esp. intelligence, leadership)
Gil Delannoi and Oliver Dowlen argue that the "average citizen" is unequipped to lead, given their average intelligence and competence.

However, a study comparing the debate quality of an Irish Citizens' Assembly and an Irish parliamentary committee found that citizens showed a deeper cognitive grasp of the subject matter at stake (abortion).

See also 

 Deliberative democracy
 Deliberative polling
 Direct democracy
 Jury
 Participatory action research
 Participatory democracy
 Sortition

References

External links
 MASS LBP
 Sorted: Civic lotteries and the future of public participation (2013)
 Initiative that sometimes uses citizens' juries for food/agricultural research in West Africa, South Asia and Andean Altiplano
 The jury is out: How far can participatory projects go towards reclaiming democracy? (2008)
 BBC Today Programme Citizens' Jury (2005)
 Film about the UK GM Jury (2004) 
 Open access analysis of citizens' juries (2002)
 An academic review of citizen's juries, published in the journal Social Research Update (2002)
 Deliberative Democracy and Citizen Empowerment (2001)
 Glasgow People's Jury: A Blueprint For Local Decision-Making (2000)

Democracy
Democratization
Juries